Mesothelial hyperplasia is a hyperplasia of mesothelial cells in serous membranes (pleura, pericardium, peritoneum).

Mesothelial hyperplasia is usually an incidental finding during peritoneal examination during laparotomy or laparoscopy. Grossly, mesothelial hyperplasia is characterized by the presence of small white nodules or flat plaques on the serous surface.

Types 
 Reactive mesothelial hyperplasia
 It is associated with a variety of chronic and acute injuries to the mesothelial surface. The inciting injury can be of inflammatory, infectious or toxic.
 Peritoneal mesothelial hyperplasia can be encountered in inflammatory pelvic disease with tubo-ovarian abscess, ovarian neoplasms (malignant or benign), and peritoneal effusions.
 Atypical mesothelial hyperplasia

References

Diseases of pleura
Peritoneum disorders
Pericardial disorders